The Municipality of Domžale is a municipality in the Ljubljana Basin in Slovenia. The seat of the municipality is the town of Domžale.

Geography
The municipality lies near the foothills of the Kamnik Alps and is crossed by the Kamnik Bistrica River, which originates in these mountains. Its landscape is characterized by forested hills and agricultural plains.

Settlements
In addition to the municipal seat of Domžale, the municipality also includes the following settlements:

 Bišče
 Brdo
 Brezje pri Dobu
 Brezovica pri Dobu
 Češenik
 Depala Vas
 Dob
 Dobovlje
 Dolenje
 Dragomelj
 Goričica pri Ihanu
 Gorjuša
 Homec
 Hudo
 Ihan
 Jasen
 Kokošnje
 Količevo
 Kolovec
 Krtina
 Laze pri Domžalah
 Mala Loka
 Nožice
 Podrečje
 Prelog
 Preserje pri Radomljah
 Pšata
 Rača
 Račni Vrh
 Radomlje
 Rodica
 Rova
 Selo pri Ihanu
 Šentpavel pri Domžalah
 Škocjan
 Škrjančevo
 Spodnje Jarše
 Srednje Jarše
 Studenec pri Krtini
 Sveta Trojica
 Turnše
 Vir
 Zaboršt
 Zagorica pri Rovah
 Zalog pod Sveto Trojico
 Žeje
 Želodnik
 Zgornje Jarše
 Žiče

History
The remains of an ice-age hunter's dwelling found at Hag's Cave in Gorjuša date to 15,000 BP. There is archaeological evidence of a pre-Roman Illyrian and Celtic settlement. Roman finds date to the time of the road connecting Aquileia, Æmona (today Ljubljana, and Celeia (today Celje). The area was first mentioned in documents dating to the 12th century. A local nobleman and owner of Krumperk Castle, Adam Ravbar, was a victor in the Battle of Sisak in 1593, in which the Ottoman army was defeated. Economic development accelerated in the 19th century with the industrialization of the local craft of plaiting straw.

References

Further reading
 Bernik, Franc. Zgodovina fare Domžale, 2 vols. Kamnik, 1923; Groblje, 1939.
 Klobčar, Marjana. Občina Domžale (Etnološka topografija slovenskega etničnega ozemlja - 20. stoletje). Ljubljana: Znanstveni inštitut Filozofske fakultete, 1989.

External links
 
 Municipality of Domžale on Geopedia
 Official page of the municipality 

 
Domzale
1994 establishments in Slovenia